ATHS may refer to:
 Addison Trail High School, Addison, Illinois, United States
 Alief Taylor High School, Alief, Texas, United States
 Arts and Technology High School, Wilsonville, Oregon, United States